Titsiros is a locality in Tsada in the Paphos District of Cyprus. Is located at 543 m above sea level. Nearby is Lartoyiannis, 1.9 km away. The terrain around Titsiros is hilly. The climate is classified as Csa by köppen climate classification.

References 

Populated places in Paphos District